Events from the year 1320 in the Kingdom of Scotland.

Incumbents
Monarch – Robert I

Events
 6 April – signing of Declaration of Arbroath

Births
 John Barbour, poet (died 1395)

See also

 Timeline of Scottish history

References

 
Years of the 14th century in Scotland
Wars of Scottish Independence